Aliabad (also Romanized as ‘Alīābād) is a village in Fathabad Rural District, in the Central District of Khatam County, Yazd Province, Iran. At the 2006 census, its population was 49, in 12 families.

References 

Populated places in Khatam County